Escalona may refer to:

Escalona, a town in the province of Toledo, Spain
Escalona del Prado, a town in the province of Segovia, Spain
Escalona, a locality in the municipality of Puértolas, province of Huesca, Spain
Alejandro Escalona, a Chilean footballer
Edgmer Escalona (born 1986), Venezuelan baseball pitcher
Miguel Escalona, a Spanish footballer
Rafael Escalona, Colombian composer
Escalona (TV series), a Colombian TV series
Río Escalona, a river in the province of Valencia, Spain
Duke of Escalona, a Spanish noble title.

Spanish-language surnames